Tisis diehli is a moth in the family Lecithoceridae. It was described by Kyu-Tek Park in 2007. It is found in Indonesia (Sumatra).

References

Moths described in 2007
Tisis